The Théâtre Comte, also called  Théâtre des Jeunes-Élèves (the latter name revived from a previous theatre, on a different site, in the rue de Thionville, that had been closed down by Napoleon's decree of June 1807), was a Parisian entertainment venue founded by the ventriloquist and magician Louis Comte in 1820. The building was located in the passage des Panoramas of the 2nd arrondissement of Paris. 

The comedian Hyacinthe made his debut in the place in 1821. In 1826, Louis Comte had to leave the passage des Panoramas for security reasons. He then commissioned the architects Allard and Brunneton the construction of a new hall in the Choiseul area being redeveloped at that time. With double access to passage Choiseul and rue Neuve-Ventadour (current rue Monsigny), it was inaugurated on 23 January 1827.

In 1846, a law prohibiting children to play in the Theaters, Louis Comte gave up the direction to his son Charles. Jacques Offenbach took the lease in 1855 and set up his théâtre des Bouffes-Parisiens, a name which this space has retained to the present day.

External links 
 THEATRE COMTE, Almanach des spectacles pour 1852 on ArteFake
 Théâtre Des Jeunes Élèves Comte, Passage Choiseul Et Rue Monsigny. Réouverture Mardi 16 Janvier 1855 Sous La Direction De M. Comte Fils. Prologue

Comte
Comte
Buildings and structures in the 2nd arrondissement of Paris